Too Cool to Conga! is a studio album by the American musical group Kid Creole and the Coconuts, released in 2001.

Production
Bongo Eddie was the only returning member of the Coconuts.

Critical reception
The Press wrote that "these are joyous songs that will please the fans, who will delight in the remake of 'Endicott' and the title track 'Too Cool To Conga'." The Washington Post wrote that "the finger-snapping dance tunes are as irresistible as ever, even if they arrive too late to take advantage of the late-'90s swing revival."

Track listing

Alternative track listings
Some editions do not include "Savanna", "1+1=1" and "Choo Choo Cha Boogie", but include either "I'm Not Your Papa" (Mukupa featuring Kid Creole) or "I Love Muchachacha" as the final track.

References

2001 albums
Kid Creole and the Coconuts albums